Carey Hamilton is an American politician who has served in the Indiana House of Representatives from the 87th district since 2016.

References

Careyhamilton.com

1971 births
Living people
Democratic Party members of the Indiana House of Representatives
21st-century American politicians
21st-century American women politicians
Women state legislators in Indiana